Enrico Piccioni (born 23 November 1961, in San Benedetto del Tronto) is a former Italian footballer in the role of centre back, whose last major appointment was as a manager of Bulgarian A PFG club Botev PLOVDIV. He has also been in charge of other clubs in Bulgaria such as Shumen 2010.

References

External links

Career profile

1965 births
Living people
People from San Benedetto del Tronto
Italian footballers
Italian football managers
A.C. Milan players
A.C. Prato players
Palermo F.C. players
S.S. Fidelis Andria 1928 players
Mantova 1911 players
Calcio Foggia 1920 players
Modena F.C. players
Parma Calcio 1913 players
S.S.D. Sanremese Calcio managers
Association football defenders
S.S.D. Sanremese Calcio players
Sportspeople from the Province of Ascoli Piceno
Footballers from Marche